Angelo Tozzi (born 1 January 1949) is an Italian former butterfly swimmer. He competed at the 1968 Summer Olympics and the 1972 Summer Olympics. He also competed in the men's 200 metre butterfly event at the 1973 World Aquatics Championships held in Belgrade, Yugoslavia.

References

External links
 

1949 births
Living people
Italian male butterfly swimmers
Olympic swimmers of Italy
Swimmers at the 1968 Summer Olympics
Swimmers at the 1972 Summer Olympics
Swimmers from Rome